Dominic James Miller (born 21 March 1960) is an Argentine-born guitarist. With much of his career as a sideman and guitarist for singer Sting, he has also released several solo albums.

Career
Miller was born in Hurlingham, Argentina to an Irish-born mother and an American-born father who worked for Johnson Wax. When he was ten, his family moved to Racine, Wisconsin, where the Johnson headquarters was located, and moved to London two years later. Returning to Racine, at fifteen, he performed publicly for the first time at a club in Racine as the only white person in a soul music band. He moved to London and studied at Guildhall School of Music, then returned to the U.S. and took a summer course at the Berklee College of Music in Boston. He also took lessons from Brazilian guitarist Sebastião Tapajós.

In the 1980s, Miller toured as a guitarist for World Party and King Swamp. As a session musician he recorded with the Pretenders, Phil Collins, Paul Young, and Level 42. Since 1991, he has recorded and toured with Sting. He co-wrote the hit song "Shape of My Heart" with Sting. He released his debut solo album, First Touch, in 1995, followed by Second Nature and Third World.

In 2003 he released the classical album Shapes, with interpretations of Bach, Beethoven, Edward Elgar, and Tomaso Albinoni.

His son Rufus (b. June 1985 in Hammersmith), also a guitarist, has recently joined the band.

Discography
 The Latin/Jazz Guitars of Dominic Miller and Dylan Fowler (Music Factory, 1984)
 Music by David Heath & Dominic Miller (Grapevine, 1985)
 First Touch (EarthBeat!, 1995)
 Second Nature (Rutis/BMG, 1999)
 New Dawn with Neil Stacey (Naim, 2012)
 Shapes (Decca, 2004)
 Third World (Alula, 2005)
 Fourth Wall (Q-Rious, 2006)
 In a Dream with Peter Kater (Point of Light, 2008)
 November (Q-Rious, 2010)
 5th House (Q-Rious, 2012)
 Ad Hoc (Q-Rious, 2014)
 Hecho en Cuba with Manolito Simonet (Q-Rious, 2016)
 Silent Light (ECM, 2017)
 Absinthe (ECM, 2019)

As sideman or guest
With Chris Botti
 Night Sessions (2001)
 When I Fall in Love (2004)

With Julia Fordham
 Porcelain (1989)
 Swept (1991)
 Falling Forward (1994)

With Vlado Georgiev
 Do svitanja (2007)
 Daljina (2013)

With King Swamp
 King Swamp (1989)
 Wiseblood (1990)

With Level 42
 Staring at the Sun (1988)
 Guaranteed (1991)

With Eddi Reader
 Mirmama (1992)
 Candyfloss and Medicine (1996)

With Soraya
 Torre De Marfil (1997)
 Cuerpo y Alma (2000)

With Sting
 The Soul Cages (1991)
 Ten Summoner's Tales (1993)
 Demolition Man (1993)
 Mercury Falling (1996)
 Brand New Day (1999)
 All This Time (2001)
 Sacred Love (2003)
 Songs from the Labyrinth (2006) - Guitar on two live songs on the Dowland Anniversary Edition of the album.
 If on a Winter's Night... (2009) - Guitar on 7 songs.
 Symphonicities (2010)
 Live in Berlin (2011)
 The Last Ship (2013)
 57th & 9th (2016)
 57th & 9th: Live From Chicago (2017) - Vinyl
 My Songs (2019)
 My Songs Live (2019, CD2 in My Songs Special Edition)
 The Bridge (2021)

With William Topley
 Black River (1997)
 Mixed Blessing (1998)
 Spanish Wells (1999))
 Sea Fever (2005)

With others
 Beth Nielsen Chapman, Sand and Water (1997)
 The Chieftains, The Long Black Veil (1995)
 Vinnie Colaiuta, Vinnie Colaiuta (1994)
 Phil Collins, ...But Seriously (1989)
 Beverley Craven, Mixed Emotions (1999)
 Gabin Dabiré Tieru (2002)
 Blossom Dearie, Blossom's Planet (2000)
 Manu Dibango, Wakafrika (1994)
 Lesley Garrett, The Singer (2003)
 Mark Hollis, Mark Hollis (1998)
 Manu Katché, It's About Time (1992)
 Ronan Keating, Ronan (2000)
 David Lanz, East of the Moon (2000)
 Marc Lavoine, Marc Lavoine (2001)
 Alejandro Lerner, Si Quieres Saber Quien Soy (2000)
 Chuck Loeb, Simple Things (1994)
 Kami Lyle, Blue Cinderella (1997)
 Mango, Come l'acqua (1996)
 Katie Melua, The House (2010)
 Wendy Moten, Life's What You Make It (1996)
 Youssou N'Dour, Joko (2000)
 Jimmy Nail, Crocodile Shoes II (1996)
 Novocento, Surrender (2009)
 Trijntje Oosterhuis, Trijntje Oosterhuis (2003)
 The Pretenders, Packed! (1990)
 A. R. Rahman, Vande Mataram (1997)
 Conner Reeves, Earthbound (2004)
 Kim Richey, Glimmer (1999)
 Eric Starr, She (2016)
 John Tesh, Guitar by the Fire (1998)
 Tina Turner, Wildest Dreams (1996)
 World Party, Bang! (1993)
 Richard Wright, Broken China (1996)
 Paul Young, Other Voices (1990)

References

External links
 Official website

1960 births
Living people
Argentine emigrants to England
Argentine emigrants to the United States
Argentine people of Irish descent
Alumni of the Guildhall School of Music and Drama
English rock guitarists
English pop guitarists
English classical guitarists
English jazz guitarists
English male guitarists
English songwriters
People from Buenos Aires
Berklee College of Music alumni
British male songwriters